Jobst Hermann von Holstein-Schaumburg (6 October 1593 at Gemen Castle in Borken – 5 November 1635 in Bückeburg) was a member of the House of Schaumburg.

Life 
His parents were Henry V, Count of Schaumburg and Holstein-Pinneberg (d. 1606), from a collateral line of the Gemen family tree, and Countess Matilda of Limburg-Styrum (1561–1622), a daughter of Count Hermann Georg of Limburg. In 1622, he became Count of Schaumburg and Lord of Gemen. Although he was raised as a Catholic, he made no attempt to change the religious denomination of his territories.

During the Thirty Years' War, he had little opportunity to influence events; however he succeeded in protecting his Lordship of Gemen from the worst oppression by imperial and Hessian troops.

Inheritance 
He married Catherine Sophia (1577–1665), daughter of Otto II, Duke of Brunswick-Harburg, but the marriage was childless, and when he died in 1635, a succession dispute broke out between the families of Holstein-Schaumburg and Limburg-Styrum in relation to the immediate Lordship of Gemen. His aunt, Countess Agnes of Limburg-Styrum, who was abbess of Elten, Vreden, Borghorst Abbey and Freckenhorst won the dispute and shortly afterwards transferred Gemen to her nephew Hermann Otto I of Limburg-Styrum, a wealthy man who had a successful career as a lieutenant general in the Dutch cavalry. When he died in 1644, he left Gemen to his second son, Adolf Ernst, who married Isabella, the daughter of Count Alexander of Velen-Meggen-Raesfeld. Adolf Ernst unsuccessfully attempted to reintroduce Catholicism in Gemen.

References 
 Helge Bei der Wieden: Schaumburgische Genealogie. Stammtafeln der Grafen von Holstein und Schaumburg - auch Herzöge von Schleswig - bis zu ihrem Aussterben 1640, 2nd revised edition, Melle,1999

External links 
 

|-

|-

Counts of Holstein
House of Schauenburg
1593 births
1635 deaths